Bintang di Surga is the second studio album by Indonesian alternative rock band Peterpan. Rolling Stone Indonesia magazine ranked the album #116 on "The 150 Greatest Indonesian Albums of All Time" list., A song from this album, "Kukatakan Dengan Indah", got a place at #140 on Rolling Stone Indonesia's "150 Greatest Indonesian Songs of All Time" list.

Bintang di Surga is generally considered to be one of the best selling albums of all time in Indonesia, with 3 million copies sold.

Artwork
The concept for Bintang di Surgas cover and graphic design was made by Thovfa CB. For the album's graphic design, Thofva CB won Best Graphic Designer award in Anugerah Musik Indonesia 2005.

Promotion
To promote the album, Peterpan held concerts in six cities on a single day on July 18, 2004. The concerts started in Medan, North Sumatra at 7:55, then continued in Padang, Pekanbaru, Lampung, Semarang, and ended in Surabaya, East Java at 23:00. Peterpan received an award from Indonesian World Records Museum for performing in six cities under 24 hours.

Accolades
In 2005, Bintang di Surga won three Anugerah Musik Indonesia awards for Best of the Best Album, Best Pop Alternative Album and Best Graphic Designer.

Noah version

In 2012, Peterpan changed their name to Noah. Due to several reasons, such as wanting their old song to be released under Noah name, a desire to improve the recordings since some songs were not recorded the way they wished, and in order to properly adapt their old songs to digital format, Noah re-recorded their songs from Peterpan era. Noah's version of Bintang di Surga was released on 12 January 2022.

In the new Noah version of the album, there are two songs not included in the track listing, which are ‘Aku’ and ‘Masa Lalu Tertinggal’. There was no explanation at the moment, depicting on why these two tracks were not included in the new album.

Track listing
All tracks are written by Ariel, except for "Aku" which is written by Ariel and Andika and "Masa Lalu Tertinggal" which is written by Ariel and Indra.
 "Ada Apa Denganmu?" (What's Up With You) – 4:40
 "Mungkin Nanti" (Maybe Later) – 4:28
 "Khayalan Tingkat Tinggi" (High-Level Imagination) – 3:23
 "Di Belakangku" (Behind Me) – 5:02
 "Ku Katakan Dengan Indah" (I Say it Beautifully) – 5:34
 "2 DSD" – 3:40
 "Diatas Normal" (Above Normal) – 3:35
 "Aku" (I) – 3:01
 "Masa Lalu Tertinggal" (The Past Behind) – 3:56
 "Bintang di Surga" (Star in Heaven) – 5:00

 Personnel 
Additional personnel credits are adapted from the album's liner notes.Peterpan Ariel – vocals
 Andika – keyboard
 Indra – bass guitar
 Lukman – guitar
 Reza – drum
 Uki – guitarAdditional personnel'
 Capung – engineering
 Ferry "Fei" – string engineering on track 4 (with Christian Hermawan)
 Heirrue Buchaery – mixing
 Khoe Hok Laij – mastering
 Job Rusli – string arrangement on track 4, 6 and 10
 Ria – vocals on track 4
 Iwan Setia – violin 1
 I. Nyoman Mahendra – violin 1
 Yoyo Sunarya – violin 1
 Satrio A.Y. – violin 1
 Fitrah Ramadhan – violin 2
 Dedy Akhmad – violin 2
 Raga Dipanegara – violin 2
 Angga Aditia – alto violin
 Agus Firmansyah – alto violin
 Juliandani – cello
 Unun S.P. – cello

Certifications

References

Noah (band) albums
2004 albums